Risto Ryti's first cabinet was the 23rd government of Republic of Finland. Cabinet's time period was from December 1, 1939, to March 27, 1940. It was Majority government.

 

Ryti, 1
1939 establishments in Finland
1940 disestablishments in Finland
Cabinets established in 1939
Cabinets disestablished in 1940